Charles Martin (born 1942, New York City) is a poet, critic and translator. He grew up in the Bronx. He graduated from Fordham University and received his Ph.D. from the University at Buffalo, The State University of New York. He now teaches at the City University of New York, Syracuse University, and the Stonecoast MFA Program at the University of Southern Maine. Martin's specialty is Latin poetry. Martin is also a New Formalist, and was an original faculty member of the West Chester University Poetry Conference.

Honors and awards
He received the Poetry Foundation's Beth Hokin Prize in 1970. His poem, "Against a Certain Kind of Ardency," was in the 2001 Pushcart Prize collection, and in 2005 he won the American Academy of Arts and Letters' Award for Literature.  Martin's Ovid literary translation won the 2004 Harold Landon Translation Award from the Academy of American Poets.

Published works
Full-length poetry collections
 
 
 
 

Critical works
 

Translations

References

External links
 Charles Martin's website
 Queensborough Community College > Martin's Faculty Page Retrieved December 28, 2006.
 Sturgeon, Shawn (2003). "Starting Point" (description of Starting from Sleep: New and Selected Poems), website of Sewanee Writers Conference. Retrieved December 28, 2006.
 Biography and links to poems, website of the Academy of American Poets. Retrieved December 28, 2006.
 Charles Martin's photographic work on En Foco, was featured in Nueva Luz photographic journal, volume 9#1.

1942 births
American poets of Irish descent
Living people
Latin–English translators
American male poets
Formalist poets
Writers from the Bronx
Fordham University alumni
University at Buffalo alumni
City University of New York faculty
Syracuse University faculty
University of Southern Maine faculty

es:Charles Martin